Kenya participated at the 2018 Summer Youth Olympics in Buenos Aires, Argentina from 6 October to 18 October 2018.

Kenya also had a competitor in swimming (girls' 100m freestyle), but she did not compete.

Medalists

Athletics

Field hockey

Boys' tournament

References

2018 in Kenyan sport
Nations at the 2018 Summer Youth Olympics
Kenya at the Youth Olympics